Thanh Khê station is a railway station on the North–South railway (Reunification Express) in Vietnam. It serves the district of Thanh Khê, on the outskirts of Đà Nẵng.

Buildings and structures in Da Nang
Railway stations in Vietnam